Grays Flat is an unincorporated community in Plumas County, California. It lies at an elevation of 2949 feet (899 m). Grays Flat is located across the North Fork Feather River from Twain.

References

Unincorporated communities in California
Unincorporated communities in Plumas County, California